Brvenica is a municipality in the northwestern part of North Macedonia. Brvenica is also the name of the village where the municipal seat is found. Brvenica Municipality is part of the Polog Statistical Region.

Geography
The municipality borders Tetovo Municipality to the north, Želino Municipality to the east, Makedonski Brod Municipality to the southeast, Gostivar Municipality to the southwest, Vrapčište Municipality to the west and Bogovinje Municipality to the northwest.

Demographics
According to the 2021 Macedonian census, Brvenica Municipality has 13,645 inhabitants. Ethnic groups in the municipality:

References

External links
Official website

 
Polog Statistical Region
Municipalities of North Macedonia